Josh Wolf or Josh Wolfe may refer to:

 Josh Wolf (comedian) (born 1969), American stand-up comedian, actor, and writer
 Josh Wolf (journalist) (born 1982), American journalist and documentary filmmaker, video blogger
 Josh Wolfe, founder of Lux Capital
 Joshua Wolfe, photographer who won the 2009 Ansel Adams Award for Conservation Photography

See also
 Josh Wolff (born 1977), American soccer player